Verduci is an Italian surname. Notable people with the surname include:

Carmine Verduci (1959–2014), Italian mobster
Giuseppe Verduci (born 2002), Italian footballer

See also
Verducci

Italian-language surnames